Robert Allison (March 10, 1777 – December 2, 1840) was a member of the U.S. House of Representatives from Pennsylvania.

Robert Allison born near Greencastle, Pennsylvania.  He attended local and private schools, and moved to Huntingdon, Pennsylvania, in 1795.  He was employed as a clerk in his brother's office, studied law, was admitted to the bar in April 1798 and commenced the practice of law in Huntingdon.  He served as a captain in the Huntingdon Volunteers during the War of 1812.  At the close of the war returned to Huntingdon and resumed the practice of law.  He served as a burgess of Huntingdon in 1815, 1817, 1819, 1821–1824, and again in 1826.

He was an unsuccessful candidate for election in 1824 to the Nineteenth Congress, in 1826 to the Twentieth Congress, and in 1828 to the Twenty-first Congress.

Allison was elected as an Anti-Masonic candidate to the Twenty-second Congress.  He was not a candidate for renomination in 1832 to the Twenty-third Congress.  He continued the practice of law in Huntingdon until his death there in 1840.  Interment in River View Cemetery.

Sources

The Political Graveyard

1777 births
1840 deaths
People from Franklin County, Pennsylvania
Anti-Masonic Party members of the United States House of Representatives from Pennsylvania
19th-century American politicians
Pennsylvania lawyers
People from Pennsylvania in the War of 1812
Burials in Pennsylvania
19th-century American lawyers